Ezequiel Lazo (born 31 January 1989) is an Argentine footballer.

He played for O'Higgins.

Personal life
He is the brother of the Rosario Central's player Lucas Lazo.

References
 

1989 births
Living people
Argentine footballers
Argentine expatriate footballers
Rosario Central footballers
O'Higgins F.C. footballers
Chilean Primera División players
Expatriate footballers in Chile
Association football defenders
Footballers from Rosario, Santa Fe